Eyesburn is a Serbian band that combines hardcore punk and crossover thrash with reggae music.

History

1994–2007 
The band was formed in 1994, and the original line-up featured former Dead Ideas guitarist Nemanja "Kojot" Kojić (guitar, backing vocals), who simultaneously worked as trombonist in Del Arno Band and bass guitarist in Sunshine, Nenad Živić (vocals), former Bloodbath member Aleksandar "Alek" Petrović (drums), former Urgh! member Vladimir "Laza" Lazić (bass guitar) and Aleksandar "Gile" Radulović. The name, Eyesburn, was chosen as a comment on the Serbian TV programs which "burned the eyes".

The band's first release, the album Freedomized, was recorded live at Belgrade club KST. During this period Eyesburn mostly played in Belgrade clubs, occasionally elsewhere in Serbia. The band also started working on their first studio album, Dog Life. However, the band's vocalist Živić left the band just several weeks before the band started recording in the studio, and Kojić took over the lead vocalist position. The album featured the songs written in English language and a cover of Bob Marley & The Wailers song "Exodus", which featured guest appearance by Del Arno Band vocalist Jovan Matić.

At the same time, Kojić started playing trombone as well, and the band started musical exploration of other genres, such as reggae, dub and drum & bass. On the various artists compilation Korak napred 2 koraka nazad, the band appeared with a cover version of Haustor song "Šejn". Soon after, Eyesburn recorded their second album Fool Control, featuring a new guitarist, Ninoslav "Nino" Filipović. The album was produced by Saša Janković. The songs "No Free Time", "Foolin' I & I", "Warning Dub", and others, presented the album as a form of modern rock, metal and breakbeat reggae fusion.

2000s 

In 2001, "Fool Control" and the track "Rizlu imaš, ličnu kartu nemaš" appeared on the soundtrack for the film Munje! in which the band appeared as a club band. As a result of their growing popularity, they received an invitation for the pre-election tours "IT'S TIME" and "USE IT (your brain)". The band started performing in former Yugoslav republics and became one of the most active bands in Serbia. During 2001, and 2002, Eyesburn performed at the EXIT festival in Novi Sad.

In late 2001, the band released the CD Gabau!, featuring eight songs, two of which, "No Free Time" and "Foolin' I & I" were recorded live in Belgrade on 22 June 2001. As guests on the album appeared Disciplin A Kitschme drummer Will Parker, percussionist Leša, and Kanda, Kodža i Nebojša vocalist Oliver Nektarijević. iN 2002, with the Jamaican dub poet Ank Steadyspear, the band recorded the album Cool Fire – Eyesburn meets Ank Steadyspear. The album was recorded separately, as Ank Steadyspear sent the already recorded vocal sections over the Internet, and the band recorded the music to the recordings. The band appeared live with Ank Steadyspear as an opening act for Lee Scratch Perry.

In 2003, the band released the album Solid, produced by Saša Janković, which was more hardcore punk-oriented than the previous release. The band's growing popularity lead to an invitation from Max Cavalera to record together the song "Moses" on the Soulfly album Prophecy and play on the 2004 Prophecy Europe Tour. Kojić also appeared on the Soulfly album Dark Ages, on the song "Innerspirit".

In March 2005, the line-up changed, when Lazić and Filipović left the band, and the new album was recorded by the lineup which included Kojić, Dalibor Vučić (bass, clarinet), Aleksandar Petrović, Vukašin Marković (trombone), Dušan Petrović (baritone saxophone). How Much for Freedom?, recorded in the Novi Sad M Studio and Zemun Cameleon Studio and produced by Boban Mulunović, featured the cover version of Bob Marley & The Wailers song "So Much Trouble In The World". The album was released under the PGP-RTS record label in Serbia and Austria. After the album release, the band went on hiatus, and Kojić pursued a solo career.

2011–2016 
In the spring of 2011, the band reunited in the lineup: Aleksandar Petrović "Alek" (drums), Vladimir Lazić "Laza" (bass), Nemanja Kojić "Kojot" (vocals, trombon), Dušan Petrović (saxophone), Aleksandar Nikić "Lale" (guitar), Zoran Đuroski "Đura" (guitar) and Vukašin Marković (trombon, backing vocals). The reunited Eyesburn had their first performance on 17 June 2011, at Belgrade's SKC, on a concert which was a part of the Jelen Top 10 Tour. On 15 September 2012, Eyesburn performed on Warrior's Dance festival, organized by British group The Prodigy and Exit festival, on Novi Sad's Petrovaradin fortress.

In July 2013, the band released their seventh studio album, Reality Check. The album, preceded by singles "Sudden Fall" and "Hold This Way", was produced by Miloš Mihajlović and mastered by Jens Bogren. In December 2015, Eyesburn with a completely new lineup released a single called "Dream is Over".

In July 2016, Kojić announced that the band ended their activity.

2018–present 
In late 2018. the band announced reunion in the following lineup: Aleksandar Petrović "Alek" (drums), Vladimir Lazić "Laza" (bass), Nemanja Kojić "Kojot" (vocals, trombon) and Aleksandar Nikić "Lale" (guitar).

In late 2020 the band released Fool Control on vinyl (remastered by Luka Matković in Citadela Studio), marking the 20th anniversary of the album.
In July 2021 Eyesburn had a recording session for Balkanrock Sessions, they recorded five songs and told interesting facts about their music life. In September 2021 Eyesburn received the first official tribute release Only We Can Solve This Problem, on which tracks were covered by Serbian bands such as Discord, Downstroy, Brat, Quasarborn, Senshi, etc. The online edition was published by Serbian Metal Portal. 

The sixth full-lenght studio titled Troops of Light was released for Mascom Records in July 2022. The track "Aware (Bam Bam)" was chosen for the first (video) single. Also, 20 years since the original release of Solid, the same label reissued it for the first time on LP in March 2023.

Discography

Studio albums 
 Dog Life (1998)
 Fool Control (2000)
 Gabau! EP (2001)
 Solid (2003)
 How Much for Freedom? (2005)
 Reality Check (2013)
 Troops of Light (2022)

Live albums 
 Freedomized (1995)

Collaborations, compilations and tribute albums 
 Cool Fire (with Ank Steadyspear; 2002)
 XX Years: Coming to You Live & Direct from Creation (2014) 
 Only We Can Solve This Problem (Tribute to Eyesburn) (2021)

Other appearances 
 "Silence Of The Twilight" (Witness Of The 1st Discussion; 1995)
 "Šejn" (Korak napred 2 koraka nazad; 1999)
 "Rizlu imaš, ličnu kartu nemaš" / "Fool Control" (Muzika iz filma 'Munje!'; 2001)
 "Junglezburn" (Metropolis 2002; 2002)

 References 

 EX YU ROCK enciklopedija 1960–2006'', Janjatović Petar;

External links 
 
 Eyesburn at Myspace
 Eyesburn at Facebook
 Eyesburn at Discogs
 Eyesburn at YouTube
 Eyesburn at Rateyourmusic
 Eyesburn at Last.fm
 Eyesburn at B92.fm

1994 establishments in Yugoslavia
Musical groups disestablished in 2007
Musical groups disestablished in 2016
Musical groups established in 1994
Musical groups from Belgrade
Musical groups reestablished in 2011
Reggae metal musical groups
Serbian hardcore punk groups
Serbian reggae musical groups
Serbian thrash metal musical groups